Jabar Sharza (Dari: جبار شرزه, born 6 April 1994) is an Afghan professional footballer who plays as a attacking midfielder for Ettan Fotboll club Ariana.

Youth career
Sharza began his youth career with Lyngby Boldklub. Sharza played also in the youth of Gentofte before making his debut for the senior team.

Career

Gentofte
Sharza played 5 games and scored 5 goals. He made a free transfer to Brønshøj in the 2014–2015 season.

Brønshøj Boldklub 
After making just 2 appearances in the 1st division he played the 2015–2016 season with Brønshøj in the 2nd division. Sharza scored 19 goals in 29 games, after that he made a transfer to Akademisk.

Akademisk Boldklub
Sharza made immediate impact in the 2016–2017 season for Akademisk with scoring freekicks and making the difference.

Fremad Amager
Sharza signed for Fremad Amager in June 2017, and left the club again at the end of 2018.

HIFK
On 21 July 2019, newly promoted Finnish Veikkausliiga club HIFK announced, that they had signed a 1.5-year contract with Sharza.

Persela Lamongan
On 25 September 2021, Sharza signed a one-year contract with Indonesian Liga 1 club Persela Lamongan on a free transfer. On 3 October, Sharza made his first league debut in a 3–0 loss against Arema as a substitute for Riyatno Abiyoso in the 74th minute at the Gelora Bung Karno Madya Stadium. On 16 October, Sharza scored his first goal for Persela against Madura United in the 55th minute at the Maguwoharjo Stadium, Sleman.

International career
Sharza was called up in January for the national team of Afghanistan. He made his debut for Afghanistan in a friendly 2–1 win over Singapore on 23 March 2017.He then made a second appearance for Afghanistan which happened to be against Cambodia and helped them win 2-1 by scoring twice in the first half.

International goals
Scores and results list Afghanistan's goal tally first.

References

External links

1994 births
Living people
Afghan footballers
Afghanistan international footballers
Danish men's footballers
Afghan emigrants to Denmark
Association football forwards
Brønshøj Boldklub players
Akademisk Boldklub players
Fremad Amager players
HIFK Fotboll players
Persela Lamongan players
Persiraja Banda Aceh players
Danish 1st Division players
Veikkausliiga players
Liga 1 (Indonesia) players
Footballers from Kabul
Afghan expatriate footballers
Expatriate footballers in Finland
Afghan expatriate sportspeople in Indonesia
Expatriate footballers in Indonesia